Casa Grande Union High School is a high school in Casa Grande, Arizona. It is part of the Casa Grande Union High School District.

The original high school and gym, now used as the Casa Grande City Hall, are listed on the National Register of Historic Places.

History

The original Casa Grande Union High School was built in 1920–21 at a cost of $135,000. It featured an indoor swimming pool and an auditorium. The large building's construction was a major milestone for the growing town between Phoenix and Tucson.

The gymnasium was added in 1936. It is Arizona's only adobe gymnasium. $12,000 was used to build the structure ($7,200 of it came from the Depression-era Works Progress Administration). The adobe was locally made with on-site earth; manufacturing it provided much-needed jobs during the Depression in hard-hit Casa Grande. It was in use as the high school until 1997, when a new, modern school with the capacity to serve 2,800 students opened at a different location. This new school quickly filled up and now has 3,200 students as of 2022-2023.

Academics
The academic departments that Casa Grande Union High offers include the following:
 English
 Mathematics
 World Languages
 Mathematics
 Fine Arts
 Science
 Social Sciences
 Exceptional Student Services
 CTE (Career and Technical Education)

Band
In 2015, 2016, and 2017 the Casa Grande Indoor Percussion Ensemble were the Percussion Scholastic Open State Champions. Scholastic Open is the highest competing High School drumline division in Arizona.

Notes

See also
List of historic properties in Casa Grande, Arizona

References

External links
 Page 12 of this document has a photo of the old Casa Grande Union High School

School buildings on the National Register of Historic Places in Arizona
Mission Revival architecture in Arizona
School buildings completed in 1921
Public high schools in Arizona
Schools in Pinal County, Arizona
Buildings and structures in Casa Grande, Arizona
National Register of Historic Places in Pinal County, Arizona
1921 establishments in Arizona